The James Kelley House, in Tennille, Georgia, was built in 1919. It was designed by architect Charles E. Choate. It was listed on the National Register of Historic Places in 1994.

It is located on Tennille—Harrison Rd. east of its junction with GA 15.

The house was nominated as part of a study of Choate's works in Washington County.

James Kelley and his father Robert Kelley "were said to be the foremost farmers in the history of Washington County."

References

National Register of Historic Places in Washington County, Georgia

1919 establishments in Georgia (U.S. state)
Buildings and structures completed in 1919